Strok, formerly Barnablaðið (in English: Children magazine), is the Faroe Islands's oldest child and youth magazine, whose history can be tracked back to 1928. All pupils in the Faroe Islands will offer to sign a one-year subscription to this popular magazine, which is not sold in stores. The magazine takes its name changes several times in its history, which the sheet is now called Strok. The magazine has since its foundation contained morality and today has expanded its dissemination through modern media such as music videos. Examples of these music videos can be watched through their web site.

History 
The first children's magazine was published at Christmas the year of 1928 and was regularly published in the original form of the following three years, after which the editors of 1931 wanted to change the editorial style. It was the teachers in Suðuroy, who was in charge of the editorial board, while the Faroese Teachers' Association published the magazine. The magazine editors were the Founders Samuel Jacob Sesanus Olsen and Sámal Johansen, the latter of which editor was replaced by Martin Joensen in September 1930.
From the appearance of the first leaf was the editorial line that the magazine would include news, stories, rhymes, guesswork and pictures.
The new editorial in 1931 with Jacob Olsen and Martin Joensen encouraged the children to take an active part in the magazine's existence by writing to the magazine, asking for the magazine as well as help in submitting stories and poems for the magazine. Moreover, drew the editors point out that morality was that children had to be responsive to parents, be kind to animals and honor the homeland, in order to become good men and women and so fail to parents and country to shame, but have pleasure and honor of the children.

The magazine's layout was 17 X 22 cm, press and newsprint cost 3 DKK per year, was released two time of month.

See also 

Education in the Faroe Islands
Faroese literature

References

External links 
 Strok official website

Faroese literature